Micah Davis (born June 8, 1993), known professionally as Masego, is a Jamaican-American musician and singer known for incorporating the saxophone into his music. Masego released two EPs in 2016, The Pink Polo EP with Medasin, and Loose Thoughts. He gained widespread attention with his collaborative record with FKJ called "Tadow" in 2017. In 2018, he released his debut album Lady Lady.

Early life
Micah Davis was born to a Jamaican father and an African-American mother. His father was in the U.S. Air Force and his mother was an entrepreneur. He also has two sisters and a brother in law. One of his sisters is a musical artist as well, the other is involved in acting and media outlets. Both his mother and father were also pastors and he was raised in a non-denominational Christian home. The military travels eventually led his family to Virginia. He also lived in Sumter, South Carolina for a couple of years while his family was moving around from state to state. He first learned how to play the drums without formal lessons in his youth. Davis has spoken about learning the piano, sax, and various drum machines. In high school, Davis adopted the name Masego, a Tswana translation of his church name "blessing." Davis attended Woodside High School (Virginia) in Newport News, and Old Dominion University in Norfolk, Virginia before leaving to focus solely on his musical career.

Musical career
In 2015, Masego released the collaborative extended play, The Pink Polo EP with Medasin, spawning the single "Girls That Dance". The next year, he released his EP Loose Thoughts.

On September 7, 2018, he released his debut album Lady Lady, including guest features from FKJ, SiR, Tiffany Gouché, and De' Wayne Jackson. His EP, Studying Abroad was released on November 13, 2020. Masego released his self-titled album on March 3, 2023.

Artistry

Musical style and influences
Drawing from his upbringing of both his parents being pastors, Davis stated that church allowed him a place to learn music from talented musicians. Davis also cited Lukky (DJ PLM), John P. Kee, Andre 3000 and Cab Calloway as influences. Davis grew up in a room with over 200 vinyl records on the walls while simultaneously having friends giving him hard hitting drums and trap music influences.

He refers to his own musical style as "TrapHouseJazz".

Discography

Studio albums

Extended plays

Mixtapes
 Blessing (January 30, 2013)
 Masego Music (June 1, 2013)
 Better with Headphones (May 29, 2014)
 Traphouse Jazz (December 12, 2014)

Singles

Other charted songs

Other guest appearances

Production discography

2016
Masego & Medasin – The Pink Polo EP
 08. "Love Be Like (Medasin Remix)"

Masego – Loose Thoughts
 All tracks (guest 'ghost' producer Lukky, DJ PLM)

2018
VanJess – Silk Canvas
 03. "Touch the Floor"

Masego – Lady Lady
 All tracks

2019
Ari Lennox – Shea Butter Baby
 04. "Up Late"

2021
Judas and the Black Messiah: The Inspired Album
 08. "Somethin' Ain't Right" (Masego featuring JID and Rapsody)
Drake – Certified Lover Boy
 01. "Champagne Poetry"

References

External links
 

Living people
1993 births
21st-century American singers
African-American male singers
American people of Jamaican descent
Musicians from Newport News, Virginia
Singers from Virginia